Three national rankings of universities in the United Kingdom  are published annually – by The Complete University Guide, The Guardian and jointly by The Times and The Sunday Times. Rankings have also been produced in the past by The Daily Telegraph and Financial Times. UK Universities also rank highly in global university rankings with 8 UK Universities ranking in the top 100 of the three major global rankings - QS World University Rankings, Times Higher Education World University Rankings and Academic Ranking of World Universities.

The primary aim of the rankings is to inform potential undergraduate applicants about UK universities based on a range of criteria, including entry standards, student satisfaction, staff/student ratio, academic services and facilities expenditure per student, research quality, proportion of Firsts and 2:1s, completion rates and student destinations. All of the league tables also rank universities on their strength in individual subjects.

Each year since 2008, Times Higher Education has compiled a "Table of Tables" to combine the results of the 3 mainstream league tables. In the 2022 table, the top 5 universities were the University of Oxford, the University of Cambridge the University of St Andrews, the London School of Economics and Imperial College.

Rankings 

The following rankings of British universities are produced annually:

The Complete University Guide

The Complete University Guide is compiled by Mayfield University Consultants and was published for the first time in 2007.

The ranking uses ten criteria, with a statistical technique called the Z-score applied to the results of each. The ten Z-scores are then weighted (as given below) and summed to give a total score for each university. These total scores are then transformed to a scale where the top score is set at 1,000, with the remainder being a proportion of the top score. The ten criteria are:

 "Academic services spend" (weight 0.5) – the expenditure per student on all academic services (data source: Higher Education Statistics Agency (HESA));
 "Degree completion" (weight 1.0) – a measure of the completion rate of students (data source: HESA);
 "Entry standards" (weight 1.0) – the average UCAS tariff score of new students under the age of 21 (data source: HESA);
 "Facilities spend" (weight 0.5) – the expenditure per student on staff and student facilities (data source: HESA);
 "Good honours" (weight 1.0) – the proportion of firsts and upper seconds (data source: HESA);(now phased out)
 "Graduate prospects" (weight 1.0) – a measure of the employability of graduates (data source: HESA);
 "Research quality" (weight 1.0) – a measure of the average quality of research (data source: 2021 Research Excellence Framework (REF));
 Research intensity" (weight 0.5) – a measure of the fraction of staff who are research-active (data sources: HESA & REF);
 "Student satisfaction" (weight 1.5) – a measure of the view of students on the teaching quality (data source: the National Student Survey); and
 "Student–staff ratio" (weight 1.0) – a measure of the average staffing level (data source: HESA).

The most recent league table (2023) ranked the top 50 (out of 130) British universities as follows:

The Guardian 

The Guardian ranking uses nine different criteria, each weighted between 5 and 15 per cent. Unlike other annual rankings of British universities, the criteria do not include a measure of research output. A "value-added" factor is included which compares students' degree results with their entry qualifications, described by the newspaper as being "[b]ased upon a sophisticated indexing methodology that tracks students from enrolment to graduation, qualifications upon entry are compared with the award that a student receives at the end of their studies". Tables are drawn up for subjects, with the overall ranking being based on an average across the subjects rather than on institutional level statistics. The nine criteria are:

"Entry scores" (15%);
"Assessment and feedback" (10%) – as rated by graduates of the course (data source: National Student Survey);
"Career prospects" (15%) (data source: Destination of Leavers from Higher Education);
"Overall satisfaction" (5%) – final-year students opinions about the overall quality of their course (data source: National Student Survey);
"Expenditure per student" (5%);
"Student-staff ratio" (15%);
"Teaching" (10%) – as rated by graduates of the course  (data source: the National Student Survey);
"Value added" (15%);
"Continuation" (10%).

The most recent league table (2023) ranked the top 50 (out of 121) British universities as follows:

The Times/The Sunday Times 

The Times/The Sunday Times university league table, known as the Good University Guide, is published in both electronic and print format and ranks institutions using the following eight criteria:

 "Student satisfaction (+50 to −55 points)" – the results of national student surveys are scored taking a theoretical minimum and maximum score of 50% and 90% respectively (data source: the National Student Survey);
 "Teaching excellence (250)" – defined as: subjects scoring at least 22/24 points, those ranked excellent, or those undertaken more recently in which there is confidence in academic standards and in which teaching and learning, student progression and learning resources have all been ranked commendable (data source: Quality Assurance Agency; Scottish Higher Education Funding Council; Higher Education Funding Council for Wales);
 "Heads'/peer assessments (100)" – school heads are asked to identify the highest-quality undergraduate provision (data source: The Sunday Times heads' survey and peer assessment);
 "Research quality (200)" – based upon the most recent Research Assessment Exercise (data source: Higher Education Funding Council for England (Hefce));
 "A-level/Higher points (250)" – nationally audited data for the subsequent academic year are used for league table calculations (data source: HESA);
 "Unemployment (100)" – the number of students assume to be unemployed six months after graduation is calculated as a percentage of the total number of known desbefore completing their courses is compared with the number expected to do so (the benchmark figure shown in brackets) (data source: Hefce, Performance Indicators in Higher Education).

Other criteria considered are:

"Completion" – the percentage of students who manage to complete their degree;
"Entry standards" – the average UCAS tariff score (data source: HESA);
"Facilities spending" – the average expenditure per student on sports, careers services, health and counselling;
"Good honours" – the percentage of students graduating with a first or 2.1;
"Graduate prospects" – the percentage of UK graduates in graduate employment or further study (data source: HESA's survey of Destination of Leavers from Higher Education (DLHE));
"Library and computing spending" – the average expenditure on library and computer services per student (data source: HESA);
"Research" (data source: 2021 Research Excellence Framework);
"Student satisfaction" (data source: National Student Survey); and
"Student-staff ratio" (data source: HESA).

Summary of national rankings

The following universities rank in the top 10 in at least two of the most recent national rankings (the three discussed above: the Complete, Guardian and Times/Sunday Times). The table is ordered according to the Times Higher Education Table of Tables (2022), based on average rank in the tables for that year. The last column gives the number of league tables (not including the Table of Tables) which include that university in their top ten.

Notes:
a Number of times the university is ranked within the top 10 of one of the three national rankings. 
b The university is ranked within the top 3 of all three national rankings. 
c The university is ranked within the top 5 of all three national rankings.

Disparity with global rankings 
It has been commented by The Sunday Times that a number of universities which regularly feature in the top ten of British university league tables, such as St Andrews, Durham and LSE (in the case of LSE 3rd to 4th nationally whilst only 101-150th in the ARWU Rankings / 56th in the QS Rankings / 37th in the THE Rankings), "inhabit surprisingly low ranks in the worldwide tables", whilst other universities such as Manchester, Edinburgh and KCL "that failed to do well in the domestic rankings have shone much brighter on the international stage". The considerable disparity in rankings has been attributed to the different methodology and purpose of global university rankings such as the Academic Ranking of World Universities, QS World University Rankings and Times Higher Education World University Rankings. International university rankings primarily use criteria such as academic and employer surveys, the number of citations per faculty, the proportion of international staff and students and faculty and alumni prize winners. 
When size is taken into account, LSE ranks second in the world out of all small to medium-sized specialist institutions (after ENS Paris) and St Andrews ranks second in the world out of all small to medium-sized fully comprehensive universities (after Brown University) using metrics from the QS Intelligence Unit in 2015. The national rankings, on the other hand, give most weighting to the undergraduate student experience, taking account of teaching quality and learning resources, together with the quality of a university's intake, employment prospects, research quality and drop-out rates.

The disparity between national and international league tables has caused some institutions to offer public explanations for the difference. LSE for example states on its website that 'we remain concerned that all of the global rankings – by some way the most important for us, given our highly international orientation – suffer from inbuilt biases in favour of large multi-faculty universities with full STEM (Science, Technology, Engineering and Mathematics) offerings, and against small, specialist, mainly non-STEM universities such as LSE.'

Research by the UK's Higher Education Policy Institute (HEPI) in 2016 found that global rankings fundamentally measure research performance, with research-related measures accounting for over 85 percent of the weighting for both the Times Higher Education and QS rankings and 100 percent of the weighting for the ARWU ranking. HEPI also found that ARWU made no correction for the size of an institution. There were also concerns about the data quality and the reliability of reputation surveys. National rankings, while said to be "of varying validity", have more robust data and are "more  highly  regarded  than international rankings".

British Universities in global rankings

The following universities rank in the top 100 in at least two global rankings:

Notes:
a Number of times the university is ranked within the top 100 of one of the three global rankings. 
b The university is ranked within the top 25 of all three global rankings. 
c The university is ranked within the top 50 of all three global rankings.

Criticism

Accuracy and neutrality
There has been criticism of attempts to combine different rankings on for example research quality, quality of teaching, drop out rates and student satisfaction. Sir Alan Wilson, former Vice-Chancellor of the University of Leeds argues that the final average has little significance and is like trying to "combine apples and oranges". He also criticised the varying weights given to different factors, the need for universities to "chase" the rankings, the often fluctuating nature of a university's ranking, and the catch-22 that the government's desire to increase access can have negative effects on league table rankings. Further worries have been expressed regarding marketing strategies and propaganda used to chase tables undermining Universities values.

The Guardian suggests that league tables may affect the nature of undergraduate admissions in an attempt to improve a university's league table position.

Roger Brown, the former Vice-Chancellor of Southampton Solent University, highlights perceived limitations in comparative data between Universities.

Writing in The Guardian, Professor Geoffrey Alderman makes the point that including the percentage of 'good honours' can encourage grade inflation so that league table position can be maintained.

The rankings are also criticised for not giving a full picture of higher education in the United Kingdom. There are institutions which focus on research and enjoy a prestigious reputation but are not shown in the table for various reasons. For example, the Institute of Education, University of London (now part of UCL), was not usually listed in the undergraduate rankings despite the fact that it offered an undergraduate BEd and was generally recognised as one of the best institutions offering teacher training and Education studies (for example, being given joint first place, alongside Oxford University, in the 2008 Research Assessment 'Education' subject rankings, according to both Times Higher Education and The Guardian).

Full-time bias
League tables, which usually focus on the full-time undergraduate student experience, commonly omit reference to Birkbeck, University of London, and the Open University, both of which specialise in teaching part-time students. These universities, however, often make a strong showing in specialist league tables looking at research, teaching quality, and student satisfaction. In the 2008 Research Assessment Exercise, according to the Times Higher Education, Birkbeck was placed equal 33rd, and the Open University 43rd, out of 132 institutions. The 2009 student satisfaction survey placed the Open University 3rd and Birkbeck 13th out of 153 universities and higher education institutions (1st and 6th, respectively, among multi-faculty universities). In 2018, Birkbeck announced that it will withdraw from UK university rankings because their methodologies unfairly penalise it, since "despite having highly-rated teaching and research, other factors caused by its unique teaching model and unrelated to its performance push it significantly down the ratings".

References

External links
 The Complete University Guide
 Guardian University Guide
 The Sunday Times University Guide 
 Global University Rankings: United Kingdom
Times Higher Education: United Kingdom

University and college rankings
Universities in the United Kingdom
Organizations established in 1992